Pharez Phillips (22 November 1855 – 9 August 1914) was an Australian politician.

Biography
Born in Mount Blackwood, he was educated at Grenville College in Ballarat before becoming a shopkeeper, farmer, and St Arnaud Town Councillor where he was three times president. He was a notable community leader in the Wimmera area. In 1896, he was elected to the Victorian Legislative Council for North Western Province, and was made an Honorary Minister in 1900. He resigned this position in 1901 in order to contest the first federal election, winning the Australian House of Representatives seat of Wimmera for the Protectionist Party. He held the seat until his retirement in 1906. Phillips died in 1914 in Ayr, Scotland.

References

1855 births
1914 deaths
Protectionist Party members of the Parliament of Australia
Members of the Australian House of Representatives for Wimmera
Members of the Australian House of Representatives
Members of the Victorian Legislative Council
20th-century Australian politicians